The Palace of Illusions: A Novel is a 2008 novel by Chitra Banerjee Divakaruni, published by Doubleday.

The novel is a rendition of the Hindu epic Mahabharata as told from Draupadi's (Panchaali's) viewpoint, namely, that of a woman living in a patriarchal world. Booklist summarizes the plot: "Smart, resilient, and courageous Panchaali, born of fire, marries all five of the famously heroic Pandava brothers, harbors a secret love, endures a long exile in the wilderness, instigates a catastrophic war, and slowly learns the truth about Krishna, her mysterious friend."

Reviews 

 "...it's really intriguing to find a book that deals differently with Draupadi - not a Manushi article or a Gender Studies tract on 'Mythical Women and Agency', but a proper story, like Vyasa's epic, where Draupadi begins. ... The 'mysterious woman' style of narration is unmistakably Divakaruni's." Renuka Narayanan, Hindustan Times
  "Is Divakaruni's novel a usefully accessible version of a remote cultural artifact, or a case of forcing a remarkable quart into a conventional pint pot?" Elsbeth Lindner, San Francisco Chronicle
 Palace of Illusions on Scribbles of Soul
 Book Review : The Palace of Illusions - July 16, 2015
Book Review: The Palace of Illusions

See also 
 Official book webpage at author's site

2008 American novels
Novels by Chitra Banerjee Divakaruni

Novels set in India
Works based on literary characters
Novels based on the Mahabharata
Doubleday (publisher) books